= Martyn Hazell =

- Occupation: Chairman of Newport Gwent Dragons

Martyn Hazell is the former chairman of the Newport Gwent Dragons, one of the four professional Rugby union regional teams in Wales.

Hazell achieved his business success in the haulage industry with his company Hazell's Haulage Ltd based in the city of Newport.
